Khvorchah (also Romanized as Khvorchāh and Khūr Chāh) is a village in Qaleh Qazi Rural District, Qaleh Qazi District, Bandar Abbas County, Hormozgan Province, Iran. At the 2006 census, its population was 664, in 140 families.

References 

Populated places in Bandar Abbas County